Yorgen Fenech (born 23 November 1981) is a Maltese businessman whose main interests are casinos and hotels in Malta. He was head of the Tumas Group and director of the Maltese-Azerbaijan-German company ElectroGas Malta.

Suspected of bribing members of the Maltese government, in November 2019 Fenech was arrested as a suspect in the murder of the investigative-journalist Daphne Caruana Galizia. He is a key figure in the 2019 Malta political crisis and 2019 protests in Malta.

Business
Fenech is a prominent Maltese businessman. He was identified in 2018 as being the owner of the Dubai-registered company 17 Black. The company was listed in the Panama Papers and investigative journalist Caruana Galizia had written about 17 Black eight months before her death, alleging the company had links to Joseph Muscat's chief of staff Keith Schembri and to former energy minister Konrad Mizzi. Later, the research group The Daphne Project came across e-mails between 17 Black and two shell companies in Panama, belonging to Mizzi or Schembri. The emails mentioned payments of up to $2 million for unspecified services. Mizzi was then Minister of Energy in Malta, Schembri Chief of Staff of Prime Minister Joseph Muscat.

Fenech was CEO of the Tumas Group and a director of energy company ElectroGas Malta; in 2019 he resigned from both positions. On 25 November 2019 Tumas Group said that allegations linking Fenech to the murder of Daphne Caruana Galizia were "alien to the Tumas Group's values".

Criminal investigations

Murder of Daphne Caruana Galizia

On 16 October 2017, investigative journalist Daphne Caruana Galizia died in a car bomb attack close to her home, attracting widespread local and international reactions. In December 2017, three men were arrested in connection with the car bomb attack. 

In November 2019, Prime Minister Joseph Muscat announced a deal with Melvin Theuma, a suspected middleman in the murder. Theuma was thought to be able to provide comprehensive information about the murder case and other crimes, and received a presidential pardon in exchange for information relating to the mastermind of the murder.

A day after Theuma's arrest, Fenech attempted to leave Malta on his private yacht, with the Armed Forces of Malta intercepting and arresting him as a "person of interest" in the Caruana Galizia murder enquiry. Fenech went on to offer himself as a witness. He promised information about the murder case and other offenses, in exchange for immunity. The request was not granted. On 30 November 2019, an indictment was filed against Fenech, and he was accused of complicity in the murder of Caruana Galizia. Fenech pleaded not guilty.

Six days after the arrest of Fenech, Keith Schembri resigned his government post as Chief of Staff, and was subsequently questioned by the police. Schembri was later released on police bail.  

The doctor Adrian Vella was also arrested for questioning. Vella's name also occurred in a number of companies registered or managed via Panama. He is said to have served as a secret messenger between Schembri and Fenech.

Fenech, in his court statement, accused Schembri of being the mastermind behind the Caruana Galizia murder. Schembri is also accused of having tried to influence Fenech in order to frame Christian Cardona as responsible for the murder of Caruana Galizia. The case is still ongoing. Fenech's multiple applications for bail were denied in May 2022, with the judge determining that he was a flight risk, citing his access to cryptocurrencies, plans to immigrate to the United States, and the purchase of cyanide and grenades.

Political

Investigations for fraud and or money laundering are being undertaken on a number of business connected to Yorgen Fenech, including ElectroGas Malta.

References

1981 births
Living people
People from Valletta
Maltese chief executives
2019 Malta political crisis